The Communist Party of Georgia was the founding and ruling political party of the Georgian Soviet Socialist Republic.

Georgia was incorporated into the Soviet Union as the Georgian Soviet Socialist Republic after 25 February 1921 when the Red Army entered its capital Tbilisi and installed a communist government led by Georgian Bolshevik Filipp Makharadze. In 1922 the Georgian SSR was incorporated into the Transcaucasian Socialist Federative Soviet Republic which lasted until 1936. During its period as a Soviet Socialist Republic it was ruled by the First Secretary of the Georgian Communist Party including; Samson Mamulia, Lavrentiy Beria, Candide Charkviani, Vasil Mzhavanadze and Eduard Shevardnadze.

On August 26, 1991, by the decision of the Georgian parliament, the Communist Party was banned. Its political descendant is the Communist Party of Georgia which was formed in 1992.

First Secretaries of the Communist Party of Georgia

 Mamia Orakhelashvili (1921–1922)
Mikheil Okujava (1922)
 Vissarion Lominadze (1922–1924)
 Mikheil Kakhiani (1924–1930)
 Levan Gogoberidze (1930)
 Samson Mamulia (1930–1931)
 Lavrenti Kartvelishvili (1931)
 Lavrentiy Beria (1931–1932; 1934–1938)
 Petre Agniashvili (1932–1934)
 Kandid Charkviani (1938–1952)
 Akaki Mgeladze (1952–1953)
 Aleksandre Mirtskhulava (1953)
 Vasil Mzhavanadze (1953–1972)
 Eduard Shevardnadze (1972–1985)
 Jumber Patiashvili (1985–1989)
 Givi Gumbaridze (1989–1990)
 Avtandil Margiani (1990–1991)
 Jemal Mikeladze (1991)

References

 
1921 establishments in Russia
1991 disestablishments in the Soviet Union
Banned communist parties